Bojan Markoski (born 8 August 1983) is a retired Macedonian football defender. He is currently the assistant manager of AEL Limassol.

Club career
He previously played with Macedonian clubs FK Cementarnica 55, FK Vardar and Rabotnički, beside Serbian top league clubs FK Bežanija and OFK Beograd.

International career
He made a debut for the Macedonian national team on 11 November 2005, in a friendly match against Iran in Teheran,  which was unofficial.  His official debut for the main national team happened a decade later, on 27 March 2015, in a UEFA Euro 2016 qualifying Group C game against Belarus.

References

External sources
  at vimeo.com
 

1983 births
Living people
Footballers from Skopje
Association football central defenders
Macedonian footballers
North Macedonia youth international footballers
North Macedonia under-21 international footballers
North Macedonia international footballers
FK Cementarnica 55 players
FK Vardar players
FK Bežanija players
OFK Beograd players
Enosis Neon Paralimni FC players
Apollon Limassol FC players
Ayia Napa FC players
FK Rabotnički players
Othellos Athienou F.C. players
Ethnikos Achna FC players
Macedonian First Football League players
Serbian SuperLiga players
Cypriot First Division players
Cypriot Second Division players
Macedonian expatriate footballers
Expatriate footballers in Serbia
Macedonian expatriate sportspeople in Serbia
Expatriate footballers in Cyprus
Macedonian expatriate sportspeople in Cyprus